4-Hydroxy-N,N-diisopropyltryptamine (4-HO-DiPT or Iprocin) is a synthetic psychedelic drug. It is a higher homologue of psilocin, 4-HO-DET, and is a positional isomer of 4-HO-DPT and has a tryptamine molecular sub-structure.

Dosage
4-HO-DiPT is orally active at around 3 mg and above, and its effects last for 2–3 hours. Higher doses such as those above 30 mgs can increase the duration of the effects significantly.

Effects
The effects of 4-HO-DiPT are broadly comparable to those of other serotonergic psychedelics such as LSD and psilocybin, but they are distinguished by their relative brevity. Shulgin "doubt[s] that there is another psychedelic drug, anywhere, that can match this one for speed, for intensity, for brevity, and sensitivity to dose, at least one that is active orally." An idiosyncratic effect of the drug, also noted by Shulgin, is its tendency to induce tremors.

Some users have reported a minor audio distortion with lower dosages. Higher dosages increase the polarity of the distortion. It is defined as being slightly lower in pitch and creating several different effects, such as pitch bend, volume distortion, and rate distortion. As with most DiPT psychedelics, music can become more dissonant and less harmonious. Users have also reported a visual distortion widely comparable to the hallucinogen LSD.

Pharmacology

Pharmacokinetics

Clinical trials
FT-104, a prodrug to 4-HO-DiPT, has entered double blind, randomized, placebo controlled, phase 1 clinical trials in healthy volunteers at the Royal Adelaide Hospital in Australia for the treatment of postpartum depression and treatment-resistant depression.

Legal status

Finland
Scheduled in government decree on psychoactive substances banned from the consumer market.

Sweden
Sveriges riksdags health ministry Statens folkhälsoinstitut classified 4-HO-DiPT as "health hazard" under the act Lagen om förbud mot vissa hälsofarliga varor (translated Act on the Prohibition of Certain Goods Dangerous to Health) as of Mar 1, 2005,  in their regulation SFS 2005:26 listed as 4-hydroxi-N,N-diisopropyltryptamin (4-HO-DIPT), making it illegal to sell or possess.

United States
4-HO-DiPT is not scheduled at the federal level in the United States, but it is possible that it could be considered an analog of 5-MeO-DiPT, in which case purchase, sale, or possession could be prosecuted under the Federal Analog Act.

Florida
"4-Hydroxy-N,N-diisopropyltryptamine" is a Schedule I controlled substance in the state of Florida making it illegal to buy, sell, or possess in Florida.

References

External links 
4-HO-DIPT entry in TiHKAL • info

Phenols
Psychedelic tryptamines
Designer drugs
Diisopropylamino compounds
Tertiary amines